The Clinton Comets were an American ice hockey team in Clinton, New York.

History 
Founded in 1927–28 as the Clinton Hockey Club and nicknamed the Comets in 1949, the team played primarily at the Clinton Arena from 1949 until 1973. The team was founded by Ed Stanley, who acted as manager, recruited local high school students as players, and provided financing for the team to buy equipment and take road trips. In the 1933–1934 season, the Comets played in the National Amateur Championship at Madison Square Garden against the Hershey Bears. The team also received support from Albert I. Prettyman, an athletic administrator known for bringing college hockey to nearby Hamilton College. The 1940 Winter Olympics were scheduled for Sapporo, Japan, but were canceled because of the start of World War II, as well as the hopes of Comets players Wilfred Goering and Art Scoones who were trying out for the Olympic team.

From 1954 until 1973, the Comets participated in the Eastern Hockey League, dominating for ten of their nineteen seasons. Most notably, under head coach Pat Kelly, the Comets posted a 315–208–64 (wins-losses-ties) record of eight seasons. During that period, in the 1967–68 season, the Comets produced an awe-inspiring 57–5–10 record. The Comets won the EHL playoffs in 1958–59, 1963–64, 1967–68, 1968–69 and 1969–70.

Later, when the team began playing games in the Utica Memorial Auditorium, it changed its name to the Mohawk Valley Comets and played in the North American Hockey League.

Notable alumni 

Notable alumni of the Clinton Comets include:
 Eddie Giacomin, Hockey Hall of Fame goaltender with the New York Rangers
 Benny Woit, former player for the Detroit Red Wings
 Pete Babando, former player for the Detroit Red Wings, Boston Bruins and Chicago Black Hawks
 Patrick J. Kelly, head coach of the Colorado Rockies, founder and first league commissioner of the East Coast Hockey League, and namesake of Kelly Cup.
 Len Speck, who played on the team from 1961–1971
 Jack Timmins, player-coach from 1954 to 1958; went on to become general manager of the Tidewater Red Wings and commissioner of the North American Hockey League
Jack Kane, 1997 Greater Utica Sports Hall of Fame inductee
Joe Robertson, minor league centre

Other hockey teams in the Mohawk Valley 

 Utica Mohawks of the Eastern Hockey League (1978–80)
 Mohawk Valley Stars of the Atlantic Coast Hockey League (1981–84)
 Mohawk Valley Comets of the Atlantic Coast Hockey League (1985–87)
 Utica Devils of the American Hockey League (1987–93)
 Utica Bulldogs of the Colonial Hockey League (1993–94)
 Utica Blizzard of the Colonial Hockey League (1994–97)
 Mohawk Valley Prowlers of the United Hockey League (1998–2001)
 Mohawk Valley IceCats of the North Eastern Hockey League (2006–07)
 Utica Comets of the American Hockey League (2013–present)

References 

 Mancuso, Jim and Zalatan, Fred. The Clinton Comets: From The Chenango Canal to National Champions. Utica, NY: Mancuso Publishing, 2005.
 Mancuso, Jim and Zalatan, Fred. The Clinton Comets: An EHL Dynasty. Utica, NY: Mancuso Publishing, 2004.
 "Clinton Comets." The Internet Hockey Database. 15 Aug. 2007. Wikimedia Foundation. 14 Apr. 2007 .

External links 
 Clinton Comets EHL Career Statistics on HockeyDB.com

Defunct ice hockey teams in the United States
Ice hockey clubs established in 1949
Ice hockey clubs disestablished in 1973
1949 establishments in New York (state)
1973 disestablishments in New York (state)
Ice hockey teams in New York (state)
Eastern Hockey League teams
Clinton (village), New York